Avior may refer to:

Avior Airlines - an airline based in Barcelona, Anzoátegui, Venezuela
Epsilon Carinae, a star